Neukyhna is a village and a former municipality in the district of Nordsachsen, in Saxony, Germany. It has an area of 40.25 km² and a population of 2379 (as of December 31, 2011). Since 1 January 2013, it is part of the municipality Wiedemar.

References 

Nordsachsen
Former municipalities in Saxony